Sawalha is an Arabic surname. Notable people with the surname include:

Julia Sawalha (born 1968), English actress
Nadia Sawalha (born 1964), English actress and television presenter
Nadim Sawalha (born 1935), Jordanian-British actor
Nabil Sawalha (born 1941), Jordanian comedian
Woroud Sawalha, Palestinian middle distance runner

Arabic-language surnames